Hainichen is a market town in Saxony, Germany. Hainichen has been shaped by its industrial past.

History

From the foundation until industrial revolution 

Hainichen used to be a place of considerable industry. Its primary manufacture was once that of flannels, baize, and similar fabrics; at the time it may have been called the centre of this industry in Germany.

On April 23, 1800, a F5/TORRO10 tornado devastated Arnsdorf, Dittersdorf and Etzdorf, near Hainichen. Despite its strength, there were no deaths.

The Gellert institution for the poor was established in 1815.

In 1933, a production plant for small delivery vans and minibuses called Framo moved from nearby Frankenberg to Hainichen. Since then, the automotive industry has been the most important employer.

Nazi era 
An early concentration camp, Hainichen concentration camp, was established in April 1933 and dissolute in June 1933.
During World War II, a subcamp of Flossenbürg concentration camp was located here, housing female prisoners working for the Framo
enterprise.

GDR 
The former plant of the Framo company was nationalized. The 1960s saw a reingeneering of delivery vans and minibuses under the Barkas B1000 brand. Hainichen became a major producer of parts for these cars.

After reunification 
Production of the B1000 delivery vans and minibuses ceased in 1991.

Population statistics 
Typical for a market town in the east of Germany, Hainichen faces the demographic problem of a steadily declining population.

Leisure and tourism

Sites and buildings of interest 

Hainichen is home of a camera obscura.

Other important sights are the Gellert museum (literature museum), Tuchmacherhaus (clothier museum) and a communal park.
Hainichen is surrounded by the beautiful valleys of the river Striegis.

Sports 

Hainichen has a communal sports centre with a small indoor pool, a communal outdoor swimming pool and a bowling centre.
Also, there is a cycling track nearby.

Industry 

Hainichen is characterised by small and medium-sized businesses.
The largest employer is the car parts maker Metalsa Automotive Hainichen GmbH (formerly ISE Industries Hainichen GmbH) (429 employees in 2005).

Districts

Areas of the city include
 Bockendorf,
 Cunnersdorf,
 Eulendorf,
 Gersdorf,
 Falkenau,
 Riechberg,
 Siegfried,
 Schlegel and
 Berthelsdorf.

International relations

Hainichen is twinned with:

 Dorsten, Germany

Famous citizens

Hainichen is the birthplace of Christian Fürchtegott Gellert, (1715-1769), to whose memory a bronze statue was erected in the marketplace in 1865. He was an important poet of the Enlightenment.
Friedrich Gottlob Keller, (1816-1895), the inventor of the groundwood pulp technique, was born in Hainichen.

More sons and daughters of the town

 Rainer Simon (born 1941), film director and screenwriter
 Konrad Zdarsa (born 1944), Bishop of the Diocese of Augsburg

References

External links
Stadt Hainichen/Sachsen 
Historical Views of Hainichen/Sachsen www.hainichen-damals.de

Mittelsachsen